is a nearly spherical sub-kilometer asteroid, classified as a near-Earth object of the Apollo group. It was first observed on 2 June 1998, by the Spacewatch survey at Kitt Peak National Observatory during 6 days during which it passed 800,000 kilometers (half a million miles) away from Earth (a little more than twice the Earth–Moon distance).

The object's orbit is well known and it was most recently observed, on 17 December 2020,  by the Cerro Paranal and Mauna Kea observatories.

Orbit and classification 

 orbits the Sun at a distance of 1.0–1.5 AU once every 16 months (500 days). Its orbit has an eccentricity of 0.20 and an inclination of 1° with respect to the ecliptic.

As a result, it is one of the most easily accessible objects in the Solar System, and its orbit frequently brings it on a path very similar to the optimum Earth–Mars transfer orbit. This, coupled with its high water content, makes it an attractive target for further study and a potential source of water for future missions to Mars.

Physical properties 

The physical properties of this object were measured by an international team of astronomers led by Dr. Steven J. Ostro of the Jet Propulsion Laboratory using a radar telescope in California and optical telescopes in the Czech Republic, Hawaii, Arizona and California.

 is characterized as a potentially metallic X-type asteroid. Optical and radar observations indicate that it is a water-rich object.

From light curve photometry in 1998, the object is measured to have a rotation period of only 10.7 minutes, which was considered to be one of the shortest sidereal days of any known Solar System object at the time; most asteroids with established rotational rates have periods measured in hours. As a result, it cannot possibly be a rubble pile, as many asteroids are thought to be, and must instead be a monolithic object.

Exploration 

The rendezvous with  will be the first visit of a rapidly rotating micro-asteroid. This will also make 1998 KY26 the smallest object to ever be studied by a spacecraft.

Further reading

References

External links
 MPEC 1998-L02
 Scott Hudson's Homepage: The Earth-Crossing Asteroid 
 Steven Ostro's Homepage: 
 
 Media Relations Office. Sun never sets, for long, on fast-spinning, water-rich asteroid (press release). Pasadena, California: Jet Propulsion Laboratory. 22 July 1999.
 
 
 

Minor planet object articles (unnumbered)

Earth-crossing asteroids

19980528
Minor planets to be visited by spacecraft